The 1985 Calabrian regional election took place on 12 May 1985.

Events
Christian Democracy was by far the largest party, despite a moderate decline in term of votes, while the Italian Socialist Party made further gains. After the election Francesco Principe, a Socialist, was re-elected President of the Region at the head of a coalition comprising also the Italian Socialist Party, the Italian Democratic Socialist Party and the Italian Republican Party (Organic Centre-left). In 1987 Principe was replaced by Rosario Olivo.

Results

Source: Ministry of the Interior

Elections in Calabria
1985 elections in Italy